Abu Muhammad Abd al-Wahid ibn Abi Hafs al-Hintati (d. 25 February 1221), or simply Abd al-Wahid, was the Almohad governor of Ifriqya from 1207 to 1221 and the father of the first Hafsid sultan Abu Zakariya Yahya.

Life 
Abd al-Wahid belonged to the Hintata, a Berber tribe of the High Atlas mountains of Morocco. His father Abu Hafs Umar ibn Yahya al-Hintati was a tribal chief of the Hintata and a close companion of Ibn Tumart who contributed to the triumph of the Almohads, occupying important positions in their government.

In October 1205, Abd al-Wahid led a cavalry of 4,000 soldiers and crushed in a battle at Jabal Tājrā southeast of Qābis Yahya ibn Ghaniya, the Banu Ghaniya warlord who attempted to conquer the Maghreb from the Almohads. In January 1206, in the company of the Almohad Caliph Muhammad al-Nasir, he obtained the surrender of al-Mahdia, whose governor, 'Ali ibn Ghazi, cousin of Yahya, rallied to the Almohad cause. Before leaving for Morocco, the caliph entrusted the administration of the province of Abd al-Wahid, one of his trusted lieutenants. This strengthened the authority of Abd al-Wahid to such an extent that his successors ceased to consider themselves governors and freed themselves from the rule of the Almohads in 1229. The new kingdom soon extended its power to Bejaia and a number of neighboring regions.

Abd al-Wahid was succeeded by his eldest son Abdullah ibn Abd al-Wahid, but he had barely declared independence when he was overthrown by his brother Abu Zakaria Yahya I, who strengthened his throne and forced his brother to agree to the title of Sheikh and devote himself to religious life.

Abd al-Wahid died in Tunis on 25 February 1221.

References

Bibliography 

 
 
 
1221 deaths
13th-century Berber people
13th-century Moroccan people
Hintata
People from the Almohad Caliphate